Keşqutan (also, Qeşqutan and Keshkutan) is a village in the Qakh Rayon of Azerbaijan.  The village forms part of the municipality of Xələftala.

References 

Populated places in Qakh District